Interplay Discovery is a program launched by Interplay Entertainment in which Interplay publishes video games for indie developers. Five games have been released under the program and each is either a platformer or a puzzle video game and is released under digital distribution.

Games

Pinball Yeah! 

Pinball Yeah! is Interplay's first game by the Discovery program and their first game since their return. From a development team named Coderunners based in Portugal, Interplay released Pinball Yeah! as their first game on iOS, it was also available on the PC, Interplay's main market. Pinball Yeah! features classic forms of pinball as well as new forms in which the player has to fight against AI such as the Kraken and help pirates search for treasure by using a pinball. Interplay re-released the game for Android in 2011.

The game features four pinball tables for the player to play from. The player must fight against an evil virtual AI system that wants nothing more than to see the demise of the player's high score. The players can also play classic pinball as well as grab peanuts from the "Ye Old Irish Pub" to save up on Leprechaun life savings.

Tommy Tronic 

Tommy Tronic  is Interplay's second game by the Discovery program and was developed by Oasis Games and was the studio's first project. Tommy Tronic is a platformer that was released exclusively for the PC. The game was well-received by critics.

Tommy Tronic features classic platforming, 12 levels of mayhem in a child's opinion, and an innovative new approach to platforming. The player must run away from Giant Carrots and fight mutated tomatoes. The game offers many bonus locations and secret areas for the player to search for as well as a progression system that contains weapons and power-ups. The game's story revolves around Tommy Tronic, a child whose pet dog is stolen by a cruel bully.

Homesteader 

Despite being the fourth announced game for the Discovery program, Homesteader is the third game released for the Discovery program. The game is developed by Bogemic Games and is a match-3 puzzle game. The game was released for the PC and the only true issue that was had with the game was a framerate error.

The player has to build a farm by matching three items, but not necessarily in a row. The game allows the player to move in eight directions rather than four which allows for more strategies. There are twenty-six levels featured per mission and four difficulty settings and chain reactions which can be turned off to increase difficulty. The game features two distinct modes, Blitz Mode in which players have a whole minute to complete the mission and Alaska Mode in which the players fight against an ever freezing ground.

Death and the Fly 

Despite being the third game announced for the Discovery program, Death and the Fly is the fourth game released for the Discovery Program. The game is developed by two people collectively known as PIG. It is a gothic platformer, the Discovery program's second platformer, and features two characters to play as: Death and the Fly. The game was given mixed reviews.

Death and the Fly features unique graphics accompanied by a grotesque design and strange music. The game features two unique characters, each that have special skills that can be used to complete any level at any time, many different traps and bonuses, an in-game shop with power-ups and many different varieties of opponents.

Crazy Cats Love 

Crazy Cats Love is developed by Wolf Games and is Interplay's first video game made using the Unity 3D engine. It is a puzzle video game in which the player must keep to cats that are madly in love together.

The game features over 130 levels with unique physics. The game is designed for kids and animal lovers. The game's story focuses around two cats that are madly in love, however their owners are moving away and they are looking for ways to stick together. More info.

References 

Video game publishers
Video game companies of the United States
Video game companies established in 2010